Chaitra H. G. (born 18 June 1984) is an Hindustani classical singer and playback singer who has sung for Kannada films.

Overview
In 1993, at the age of eight, Chaitra ventured into the music industry to sing for the film Beda Krishna Ranginata under the music direction of V. Manohar, which marked the beginning of Chaitra's career as a playback singer.

She returned to playback singing in the year 2003 for the film Bhagawan and since then has been known for her unconventional voice and her style of singing. Her "Huduga Huduga" song from the Kannada language film Amrithadhare won her the state award as the Best playback singer in 2005.

Discography

Accolades
 2005–06: Karnataka State Film Award for Best Female Playback Singer: "Huduga Huduga" from Amrithadhare
 2007: Special Mention Award for Young Achievers by Rotary Bangalore Midtown & Brigade Group
 2012: Udaya TV Kutumba Award for Best Singer: "Jokali"

References

External links
 
 

Living people
Kannada playback singers
Hindustani singers
Indian women classical singers
Indian women playback singers
Malayalam playback singers
Telugu playback singers
Tamil-language singers
1984 births
Singers from Bangalore
Film musicians from Karnataka
21st-century Indian women singers
21st-century Indian singers
Women Hindustani musicians
Women musicians from Karnataka
Bigg Boss Kannada contestants